Events from the year 1765 in Wales.

Incumbents
Lord Lieutenant of Anglesey - Sir Nicholas Bayly, 2nd Baronet
Lord Lieutenant of Brecknockshire and Lord Lieutenant of Monmouthshire – Thomas Morgan
Lord Lieutenant of Caernarvonshire - Thomas Wynn
Lord Lieutenant of Cardiganshire – Wilmot Vaughan, 1st Earl of Lisburne
Lord Lieutenant of Carmarthenshire – George Rice
Lord Lieutenant of Denbighshire - Richard Myddelton  
Lord Lieutenant of Flintshire - Sir Roger Mostyn, 5th Baronet 
Lord Lieutenant of Glamorgan – Other Windsor, 4th Earl of Plymouth
Lord Lieutenant of Merionethshire - William Vaughan
Lord Lieutenant of Montgomeryshire – Henry Herbert, 1st Earl of Powis 
Lord Lieutenant of Pembrokeshire – Sir William Owen, 4th Baronet
Lord Lieutenant of Radnorshire – Howell Gwynne

Bishop of Bangor – John Egerton
Bishop of Llandaff – John Ewer
Bishop of St Asaph – Richard Newcome
Bishop of St Davids – Samuel Squire

Events
July - Henry Herbert, 1st Earl of Powis, resigns from his position as Treasurer of the Household when his former party, the Whigs, are returned to power.
6 December – The Penrhyn estate comes into the possession of the Pennant family, through the marriage of Richard Pennant with the heiress of the Warburton family.
unknown dates
Cyfarthfa Ironworks is founded by Anthony Bacon. 
Richard Price becomes a Fellow of the Royal Society.

Arts and literature

New books
John Jones - Catholic Faith and Practice

Music
12 August - The Royal Shepherd, by Richard Rolt, is performed in Dublin to celebrate the birthday of the Prince of Wales.

Births
4 May - Hopkin Bevan, minister and writer (died 1839)
23 August - James Davies, schoolmaster
8 October - George Rice, 3rd Baron Dynevor, politician (died 1852)
13 October - J. R. Jones (Ramoth), Baptist minister (died 1822)
date unknown - David Jones, barrister (died 1816)

Deaths
10 April - Edward Heylyn, porcelain manufacturer, 69/70
11 April - Lewis Morris, hydrographer and writer, eldest of the Morris brothers of Anglesey, 64
16 May - William Wynne, lawyer and author, about 73
8 June - Silvanus Bevan, apothecary, 73/74
16 December - Thomas William, Methodist exhorter, 48
29 December - Prince Frederick William of Wales, son of the former Prince and Princess of Wales, 15

References

Wales
Wales